Iris × germanica is the accepted name for a species of flowering plants in the family Iridaceae commonly known as the bearded iris or the German bearded iris. It is one of a group of hybrid origin. Varieties include I. × g. var. florentina.

Description 
Hundreds of cultivars exist representing nearly every colour from jet black to sparkling whites and red. Some cultivars are known to re-bloom in the autumn (fall).

Biochemistry
It is known to produce the isoflavone irilone, and several analytical studies have been made from the rhizomes.

Genetics
As most irises are diploid, having two sets of chromosomes. This can be used to identify hybrids and classification of groupings.
It has had its chromosome counted several times; 2n=44, Banerji & Chaudhuri, 1972; 2n=28, Mao 1986; 2n=44 Sopova 1982; 2n=44, Váchová & Feráková, 1986 and 2n=44, Lovka, 1995.

Taxonomy
It is most commonly known as 'bearded iris' and in the UK occasionally as 'common German flag'.

It was first published and described as Iris germanica by Carl Linnaeus in his book 'Species Plantarum' on page 38 in 1753. Although, Kew and many other authorities state that it is a hybrid, so is named as Iris × germanica, with the cross 'x' showing its hybrid status.

It is a European hybrid, rather than a true wild species. Iris × germanica is considered to have been a natural hybrid between Iris pallida and Iris variegata Linnaeus, both of which also have the chromosome number 2n = 24.

Iris germanica is an accepted name by the RHS, and it was verified by United States Department of Agriculture Agricultural Research Service on 8 May 1996. They also state it has unknown parentage.

The named cultivars are most commonly sold in shops as Iris germanica,

Distribution and habitat
Iris × germanica is thought to be originated in Mediterranean Europe.

Range
It is widely naturalized across Europe.

Cultivation
It prefers to grow in full sun, with well-drained soil. It normally retains some of its leaves over the winter period. After it has flowered and during dry conditions through the summer is best time to divide and transplant.

Propagation
It can be propagated by seed and by division.

Hybrids and cultivars
Iris × germanica has many cultivars, there are thought to be about 60,000 cultivars available. These are a few known named cultivars:

 'Adriatic Shores'
 'Amas'
 'Askabadensis'
 'Baveilles'
 'Belouinii'
 'Biliotti'
 'Black Prince'
 'Col Du Chat'
 'Cretan'
 'Crimson King'
 'Croatica'
 'Deflexa'
 'Dominion'
 'Dusky Challenger'
 'Florentina'
 'Fontarabie'
 'Germanica'
 'Germanica Alba'
 'Germanica Caerulea'
 'Germanica Major'
 'Germanica Marmorata'
 'Germanica Maxima'
 'Germanica Violacea'
 'Germanica Vulgaris'
 'Gnome'
 'Gypsy Queen'
 'Istria'
 'Junonia'
 'Kharput'
 'Kirman'
 'Kochii'
 'Kurdistan'
 'Lemperg Purple'
 'Macrantha'
 'Nepalensis'
 'Oriflamme'
 'Paladin'
 'Purple King'
 'Seattle'
 'Sivas'
 'Srinagar'
 'Thun'
 'Titan's Glory'
 'Turchino'
 'Varbosiana'
 'Varbossana'.

I. × germanica var. amas was one of the most important cultivars in the creation of the modern tetraploid tall-bearded Irises.

In culture

In Iran and Kashmir, Iris kashmiriana and Iris × germanica are most commonly grown on Muslim grave yards.

It has frequently been painted including 'Irises' (see right) and 'Irises' both by Vincent van Gogh in 1890.

Photo gallery

See also
 Orris root

References

Sources
 Czerepanov, S. K. 1995. Vascular plants of Russia and adjacent states (the former USSR) Cambridge University Press. Note: lists as Iris germanica L.
 Davis, P. H., ed. 1965–1988. Flora of Turkey and the east Aegean islands. Note: lists as Iris germanica L.
 Encke, F. et al. 1993. Zander: Handwörterbuch der Pflanzennamen, 14. Auflage Note: = species
 FNA Editorial Committee. 1993-. Flora of North America. Note: lists as Iris germanica L.
 Komarov, V. L. et al., eds. 1934–1964. Flora SSSR. Note: = Iris germanica L.
 Lampe, K. F. & M. A. McCann. 1985. AMA handbook of poisonous and injurious plants
 Mathew, B. 1981. The Iris. 25–28.
 Nasir, E. & S. I. Ali, eds. 1970-. Flora of [West] Pakistan.
 Personal Care Products Council. INCI
 Rechinger, K. H., ed. 1963-. Flora iranica. Note: lists as Iris germanica L.
 Stace, C. 1995. New flora of the British Isles. Note: natzd.
 Townsend, C. C. & E. Guest. 1966-. Flora of Iraq. Note: = Iris germanica L.
 Tutin, T. G. et al., eds. 1964–1980. Flora europaea. Note: = Iris germanica L.*
 Waddick, J. W. & Zhao Yu-tang. 1992. Iris of China
 Walters, S. M. et al., eds. 1986–2000. European garden flora

germanica
Flora of Europe
Garden plants of Europe
Plants described in 1753
Taxa named by Carl Linnaeus